The Men's Greco-Roman 97 kg is a competition featured at the 2018 European Wrestling Championships, and was held in Kaspiysk, Russia on May 1 and May 2.

Medalists

Results 
 Legend
F — Won by fall

Final

Top half

Bottom half

Repechage

References

Men's greco-roman 97 kg